Spintherophyta is a genus of leaf beetles in the subfamily Eumolpinae. Most species in the genus are found in Central and South America, but there are also a few North American species.

Species
These species belong to the genus Spintherophyta:

 Spintherophyta antennata (Lefèvre, 1887)
 Spintherophyta arizonensis Schultz, 1976 i c g b 
 Spintherophyta atroviolacea (Jacoby, 1890)
 Spintherophyta aurichalcea (Germar, 1824)
 Spintherophyta callida (Bechyné, 1950)
 Spintherophyta championi (Jacoby, 1881)
 Spintherophyta collaris (Lefèvre, 1885)
 Spintherophyta corrusca (Lefèvre, 1877)
 Spintherophyta cribricollis (Lefèvre, 1889)
 Spintherophyta cyanipennis (Jacoby, 1890)
 Spintherophyta diversicornis (Jacoby, 1900)
 Spintherophyta erythropoda (Bechyné, 1953)
 Spintherophyta exigua Schultz, 1976 i c g 
 Spintherophyta festiva (Lefèvre, 1877)
 Spintherophyta flavipes (Jacoby, 1881)
 Spintherophyta frontalis Lefèvre, 1877
 Spintherophyta fruhstorferi (Bechyné, 1955)
 Spintherophyta fulvicornis (Jacoby, 1890)
 Spintherophyta fuscitarsis (Lefèvre, 1877)
 Spintherophyta globosa (Olivier, 1808) i c g b 
 Spintherophyta granulata (Jacoby, 1890)
 Spintherophyta hoegei (Jacoby, 1881)
 Spintherophyta igneicollis (Baly, 1864)
 Spintherophyta ignita (Lefèvre, 1877)
 Spintherophyta jacobyi Sublett & Cook, 2021
 Spintherophyta jucunda (Lefèvre, 1885)
 Spintherophyta kirschi (Harold, 1874)
 Spintherophyta laevicollis (Lefèvre, 1885)
 Spintherophyta laevigata (Lefèvre, 1878)
 Spintherophyta lectiuncula (Bechyné, 1951)
 Spintherophyta lectiuncula lectiuncula (Bechyné, 1951)
 Spintherophyta lectiuncula polychromella Bechyné, 1958
 Spintherophyta limitropha (Bechyné, 1950)
 Spintherophyta lunai (Bechyné, 1951)
 Spintherophyta malaisei (Bechyné, 1949)
 Spintherophyta marginicollis (Jacoby, 1881)
 Spintherophyta melania (Bechyné, 1955)
 Spintherophyta minuta (Jacoby, 1881)
 Spintherophyta nana (Jacoby, 1890)
 Spintherophyta olaena (Bechyné, 1951)
 Spintherophyta opacicollis (Lefèvre, 1885)
 Spintherophyta opulenta (Lefèvre, 1877)
 Spintherophyta ornata (Jacoby, 1881)
 Spintherophyta ornaticollis (Jacoby, 1881)
 Spintherophyta paraguayensis (Jacoby, 1898)
 Spintherophyta parvula (Lefèvre, 1885)
 Spintherophyta parvula crassa (Bechyné, 1955)
 Spintherophyta parvula parvula (Lefèvre, 1885)
 Spintherophyta podtianguini (Bechyné, 1951)
 Spintherophyta praestans (Bechyné, 1950)
 Spintherophyta pubescens (Jacoby, 1881)
 Spintherophyta pucaya (Bechyné, 1955)
 Spintherophyta punctum Gilbert & Clark, 2020
 Spintherophyta purpurea (Harold, 1874)
 Spintherophyta purpureicollis (Jacoby, 1881)
 Spintherophyta pusilla (Jacoby, 1890)
 Spintherophyta querula (Bechyné, 1950)
 Spintherophyta reticulata (Lefèvre, 1885)
 Spintherophyta semiaurata (Klug, 1829)
 Spintherophyta servula (Lefèvre, 1887)
 Spintherophyta simplocarina (Bechyné, 1954)
 Spintherophyta subsericea (Bechyné, 1955)
 Spintherophyta sulcifrons (Harold, 1874)
 Spintherophyta surrabaya (Bechyné, 1955)
 Spintherophyta thoracica (Jacoby, 1881)
 Spintherophyta tibialis (Lefèvre, 1889)
 Spintherophyta trinidadensis (Bechyné, 1951)
 Spintherophyta versicolor (Lefèvre, 1876)
 Spintherophyta vicina (Jacoby, 1890)
 Spintherophyta violacea Jacoby, 1890
 Spintherophyta violaceipennis (Horn, 1892) i c g b 
 Spintherophyta viridiceps (Bechyné, 1950)
 Spintherophyta viridis (Lefèvre, 1876)

Data sources: i = ITIS, c = Catalogue of Life, g = GBIF, b = Bugguide.net

Synonyms:
 Spintherophyta alutacea (Jacoby, 1898): synonym of Spintherophyta opacicollis (Lefèvre, 1885)
 Spintherophyta cupriceps (Lefèvre, 1877): moved to Brachypnoea
 Spintherophyta fulgurans (Harold, 1874): synonym of Spintherophyta igneicollis (Baly, 1864)
 Spintherophyta incerta (Lefèvre, 1876): synonym of Spintherophyta igneicollis (Baly, 1864)
 Spintherophyta laticollis (Jacoby, 1900): synonym of Spintherophyta igneicollis (Baly, 1864)
 Spintherophyta maronica (Bechyné, 1950): synonym of Spintherophyta igneicollis (Baly, 1864)
 Spintherophyta nigrita (Baly, 1878): moved to Nycterodina
 Spintherophyta peruana (Jacoby, 1898): synonym of Spintherophyta igneicollis (Baly, 1864)
 Spintherophyta pilosa (Lefèvre, 1877): moved to Trichospinthera
 Spintherophyta punctatostriata (Lefèvre, 1875): moved to Nycterodina
 Spintherophyta subcostata (Jacoby, 1900): moved to Nycterodina
 Spintherophyta tarsalis (Lefèvre, 1885): moved to Nycterodina, synonym of Nycterodina nigrita (Baly, 1878)

Renamed species:
 Spintherophyta fulvicornis (Jacoby, 1890: 197) (secondary junior homonym of Spintherophyta fulvicornis (Jacoby, 1890: 185)), renamed to Spintherophyta jacobyi Sublett & Cook, 2021

References

Further reading

External links

Eumolpinae
Chrysomelidae genera
Articles created by Qbugbot
Taxa named by Pierre François Marie Auguste Dejean